Piet van Overbeek (6 May 1926 – 8 January 2004) was a Dutch footballer. He played in one match for the Netherlands national football team in 1949.

References

External links
 

1926 births
2004 deaths
Dutch footballers
Netherlands international footballers
Place of birth missing
Association footballers not categorized by position